Gobiderma is an extinct genus of Late Cretaceous lizard whose fossils are known from the Gobi Desert in southern Mongolia. It was first discovered as a result of a joint Polish-Mongolian Paleontological Expedition, and formally named in 1984. In life, it probably resembled lizards of the genus Heloderma to a large degree, though its skull was more elongated than lizards of that genus.

Sources 
 Dragons in the Dust: The Paleobiology of the Giant Monitor Lizard Megalania by Ralph E. Molnar (page 91) 
 In the Shadow of the Dinosaurs: Early Mesozoic Tetrapods by Nicholas C. Fraser and Hans-Dieter Sues (page 30) 
 The Age of Dinosaurs in Russia and Mongolia by Michael J. Benton, Mikhail A. Shishkin, David M. Unwin, and Evgenii N. Kurochkin (page 381) 
 Cretaceous Environments of Asia (Developments in Palaeontology and Stratigraphy) by N.-J. Mateer  (page 59) 

Cretaceous lizards
Late Cretaceous lepidosaurs of Asia
Gobi Desert
Fossil taxa described in 1984